The 3rd Infantry, Arkansas State Troops (1861) was an Arkansas State infantry regiment that served during the American Civil War. The regiment was designated as the 2nd Infantry, Arkansas State Troops, by the State Military Board, but it was named the 3rd Arkansas by Brigadier General Nicholas Bartlett Pearce, Commander, 1st Division, Provisional Army of Arkansas. The regiment is generally referred to as the "3rd Regiment, Arkansas State Troops", or "Gratiot's Regiment" in contemporary accounts. This unit is distinguished from the 3rd Arkansas Infantry Regiment which served in the Eastern Theater of War in the Confederate Army of Northern Virginia.  The unit is also distinguished from a later state organization known as Adams' 3rd Arkansas State Troops, which was organized in 1862 and participated in the Battle of Prairie Grove before being disbanded.

Organization 
At the beginning of the war, the Arkansas Succession Convention created the Provisional Army of Arkansas.   The Provisional Army was to consist of two divisions: the 1st Division in the western part of the state was to be commanded by Brigadier General Pearce, and the 2nd Division in the eastern half of the state, commanded by Major General James Yell.  The intent of the Secession Convention was to transfer these state troop regiments into Confederate service as quickly as possible, to avoid the cost of paying for a large state army.  The troops of the eastern division were transferred to the command of Brigadier General Hardee in July 1861, but the troops of the western division under Brigadier General Pearce were not transferred to Confederate service before they became engaged in the Battle of Wilson's Creek.

The unit's designation as the 3rd Regiment, Arkansas State Troops has its origins in the confusion caused by Brigadier General Nicholas B. Pearce's failure to comply with the numbering system for regiments adopted by the State Military Board. The State Military Board authorized a 1st and 3rd Arkansas Regiment of State Troops. The 1st Regiment was commanded by Colonel Patrick R. Cleburne and was organized a Mound City, in the 2nd or Eastern Division of the Army of Arkansas. The State Military Board had authorized a 3rd Regiment of State Troops as a cavalry regiment under Colonel DeRosey Carroll, and ordered it to join the 1st Division" of the Army of Arkansas commanded by General Nicholas B. Pearce in northwest Arkansas. The free-spirited General Pearce ignored the unit designations authorized by the State Military Board, and assigned his own designations, based on when each regiment showed up in camp to muster. The first units to arrive at the designate assembly point were naturally  the mounted units which became Carroll's regiment, so the 3rd Regiment Arkansas State Troops was re-designated the 1st Regiment.  The officially sanctioned 2nd Regiment Arkansas State Troops, under Colonel John R. Gratiot, arrived at the assembly point third, and was immediately renamed the 3rd Regiment. Thus, all accounts of the State Troops in northwest Arkansas, including the battle of Wilson's Creek, refer to Gratiot's regiment as the 3rd Arkansas.

This designation also leads to confusion with the other, more famous, 3rd Arkansas, commanded by Colonels Albert C. Rust and Van H. Manning. The Rust/Manning "3rd Arkansas", was not a regiment that was ever officially authorized by the Arkansas State Military Board.  By the time that several volunteer companies in South Arkansas had recruited and organized, the State had already reached its original goal of eight regiments, so the services of these new companies were declined on the thought that war would not last long.  These companies decided to go to Virginia and volunteer their services there.  This group of regiments moved to Lynchburg, Virginia and organized themselves into a regiment, and elected Albert Rust as their colonel. They were mustered into service by the Confederate War Department as the 3rd Regiment Arkansas Volunteers.  There are those to this very day who insist that Rust's 3rd Arkansas was the same unit that fought at Wilson's Creek, despite unimpeachable documentation showing that Rust's unit was camped on the Greenbrier River in Virginia at the time of the battle.

The regiment was organized on July 15, 1861.  Many of the companies that joined the regiment had been organized as volunteer militia companies prior to secession. One of these companies, the Frontier Guards, of Crawford County had participated in the seizure of the Federal Arsenal at Fort Smith by Borland's Militia Battalion on April 23, 1861.  The regiment was composed of the following volunteer companies:

 Company A, the "Fort Smith Rifles", of Sebastian County, commanded by Captain James H. Sparks. This unit was originally organized as a volunteer company in the 51st Regiment, Arkansas State Militia, on January 12, 1860.
 Company B, the "Hempstead Rifles", of Hempstead County, commanded by Captain John R. Gratiot.,<ref
name=Gerdeshampstead/> William Hart was promoted to Captain when John R. Gratiot was elected Colonel of the Regiment. This unit was originally organized as a volunteer company in the 8th Regiment, Arkansas State Militia, on January 12, 1860.
 Company C, the "Pike Guards", of Washington County, commanded by Captain Samuel R. Bell.  This company was originally organized on May 29, 1861, as a volunteer company of light infantry in the 20th Regiment, Arkansas State Militia.
 Company D, the "Cane Hill Rifles", of Washington County, commanded by Captain Pleasant W. Buchanan.
 Company E, of Sebastian County, commanded by John Griffith.
 Company F, the "Crawford Artillery", of Crawford County, commanded by Captain James T. Stewart.
 Company G, the "Van Buren Frontier Guards", of Crawford County, commanded by Captain Hugh T. Brown.  This unit was originally organized as a volunteer company in the 5th Regiment, Arkansas State Militia on January 12, 1861.
 Company H, the "Johnson Guards", of Johnson County, commanded by Captain Alfred D. King.  This company was originally organized on November 27, 1860, as an Independent Company Cavalry company of in the 10th Regiment, Arkansas State Militia of Johnson County.
 Company I, of Sebastian County, commanded by Captain William C. Corcoran
 Company K, the "Crawford Guards", of Crawford County, commanded by Captain Joel H. Foster.

Either Company E or Company I was known as the "Sebastian Guards", but since both companies were from Sebastian County, it is unclear which company used this name.

Battles 
The 1st Division (Brigade) Arkansas State Troops, along with Brigadier-General Ben McCulloch's Confederate brigade, marched north into Missouri, where they linked up with Major General Sterling Price's Missouri State Guard. The combined force then moved towards Springfield, Missouri.  Under the command of fought at the Battle of Wilson's Creek, Missouri, on August 10, 1861. On the morning of August 10, 1861, while encamped along Wilson's Creek, just south of Springfield, Missouri, the Southern army was attacked by a Union force under Brigadier General Nathaniel Lyon. The ensuing battle was one of the largest and most desperately fought engagements in the western theater. Colonel John R. Gratiot's, 3rd Regiment, Arkansas State Troops had been held in reserve during the early part of the battle; however, a renewed Union assault on the Confederate right flank prompted calls for its immediate deployment. Forming in a long battle line, Gratiot's regiment charged up Oak Hill toward the Union lines.  The regiment had reached a point about 40 yards from the enemy when the Federals unleashed a massive volley directly into the charging Arkansans. The regiment wavered momentarily, as scores of men fell dead or wounded, then charged forward with a roar and smashed into the Federals. After a vicious, face-to-face fight, using bayonets and clubbed muskets, the Southerners broke the Federal line. The unit suffered 109 casualties, including twenty-five killed, out of a force of 500 men.

Disbanded
Following the battle, the Garrott's Regiment marched back to Arkansas and was given the opportunity to vote on the issue of being transferred into Confederate service.  The regiment, along with the rest of the 1st Division voted to disband rather than be transferred to Confederate service. The unit was mustered out of state service on September 19, 1861. Most of its members subsequently enlisted in regular Confederate regiments, including the 1st Battalion Arkansas Cavalry, 17th Arkansas Infantry Regiment (Griffith's) and 34th Arkansas Infantry Regiment.  Some later served in the Indian Territory.

An extraordinary number of the Hempstead Rifles went on to become officers in the Confederate army. At least three of them, besides Colonel Gratiot, went on to become field-grade officers: Daniel W. Jones, colonel in the 20th Arkansas Infantry Regiment; Benjamin P. Jett, Jr., major in the 17th (Griffith's) Arkansas Infantry Regiment; and Jesse A. Ross, major in the 4th Arkansas Infantry Battalion. Two went on to command artillery batteries: Chambers B. Etter, captain of the 6th Arkansas Field Battery; and William P. Hart, captain of the 2nd Arkansas Field Battery. Another twenty or so went on to become lieutenants and captains of infantry companies and cavalry troops.

Flags
Many of the original companies raised for the war received handmade flags which were presented to them in elaborate ceremonies in their hometown before marching off to war.  In the first year of the war, many of these home made banners were "1st National Flag" pattern, meaning that they were patterned after the first national flag authorized for the new Confederate Government.  The new Confederate Banner, often referred to as the "Stars and Bars", consisted of "a red field, with a white space extending horizontally through the center, equal in width to one third the width of the flag, and red spaces above and below to the same width as the white, the union blue extending blue extending down through the white space and stopping in the lower red space, in the center of the union, a circle of white stars corresponding in number with the States of the Confederacy."  The white stripe was a convenient place for the flag makers to embellish the flag with some motto or inscription.

At least two of these 1st National Flag pattern colors were present to units in the 3rd Regiment, Arkansas State Troops.  On May 4, 1861, Miss Bettie Conway present a flag to the Hempstead Rifles, along with a stirring speech.  This flag, with its stars arranged in three rows of three, many be seen in a photo made of the company before its departure from Arkadelphia.

Another 1st National Flag pattern flag was presented to the Pike Guards, of Washington County, on May 2, 1861, by Ms Thomas J. (Mary Willis Stirman) Pollard at Fayetteville. In place of the blue union, the flag of the Pike Guards has a white field with a painting of the Lady of Liberty.  The words "OUR COUNTRY & OUR RIGHTS" were inscribed on the red strips on the front and the words "PIKE GUARDS" was inscribed on the white strip on the reverse side. This flag was allegedly captured in 1864 when Union forces occupied the city of Camden, Arkansas.  The flag is now in the keeping of the Kansas State Historical Society in Topeka Kansas.

See also 

 List of Arkansas Civil War Confederate units
 Lists of American Civil War Regiments by State
 Confederate Units by State
 Arkansas in the American Civil War
 Arkansas Militia in the Civil War

References

Further reading 
 Piston, William Garrett, and Richard W. Hatcher III. Wilson's Creek: The Second Battle of the Civil War and the Men Who Fought It. Chapel Hill: University of North Carolina Press, 2000, .
 Hess Earl J, Hatcher, William G., Piston, Richard W., and Shea, William L. Wilson's Creek, Pea Ridge, and Prairie Grove: A Battlefield Guide, with a Section on Wire Road, University of Nebraska Press, 2006, .

External links 
 Edward G. Gerdes Civil War Home Page
 The Encyclopedia of Arkansas History and Culture
 The War of the Rebellion: a Compilation of the Official Records of the Union and Confederate Armies
 The Arkansas History Commission, State Archives, Civil War in Arkansas
 

Units and formations of the Confederate States Army from Arkansas
Military units and formations in Arkansas
Military units and formations established in 1861
Military units and formations disestablished in 1861
Military in Arkansas
1861 establishments in Arkansas